Zeus is a wooden roller coaster located at Mt. Olympus Water & Theme Park in Wisconsin Dells, Wisconsin. The ride was built by Custom Coasters International and opened in 1997. The ride operates with a single train built by the Philadelphia Toboggan Company that has five cars each with four seats.

Ride Experience
The coaster turns 180 degrees out of the station and ascends the 90 foot lift hill. A left hand turn and the ride drops 85 feet. A series of low airtime hills take the ride under the lift hill of the Hades roller coaster and out to the back of the park. A high speed turn around puts the track parallel to the first set of hills. More airtime hills and a right hand turn bring the train back to the station.

History
Zeus was partially retracked at the end of the 2018 season in order to provide a smoother riding experience.

References
Zeus's listing at RCDB.com

Roller coasters in Wisconsin
Roller coasters introduced in 1997
Zeus